Imma atrosignata is a moth of the family Immidae. It is known from Ambon Island of Indonesia.

The wingspan is about 20 mm. The forewings are fuscous with a slightly darker crescentic mark at the end of the cell. The hindwings are fuscous-grey, towards the base and dorsum thinly scaled and translucent and with an elongate wedge-shaped deep black mark on either side of the antemedian vein from the base to near, but not touching the termen.

References

Immidae
Moths described in 1861
Moths of Asia